Thopeutis diffusifascia is a moth in the family Crambidae. It was described by Harrison Gray Dyar Jr. in 1910. It is found in Uruguay.

References

Haimbachiini
Moths described in 1910